Nguyễn Minh Chuyên (born November 9, 1985 in Bình Thuận, Vietnam) is a Vietnamese footballer who played as a midfielder.

References

 

1985 births
Living people
Vietnamese footballers
Association football midfielders
Xuan Thanh Saigon Cement FC players
Footballers at the 2006 Asian Games
Asian Games competitors for Vietnam
Vietnam international footballers
People from Bình Thuận Province